Garnier de Rochefort, a 12th-century French cleric, was Abbot of Auberive (1175–1180), Abbot of Clairvaux (1186–1193), and finally Bishop of Langres (1193–1199).

Biography 
Garnier de Rochefort was descended from the noble family of Rochefort-sur-Brévon. He first became a monk at the Abbey of Longuay, then Abbot of Auberive around 1175. In 1180, he became a prior, then in 1186 Abbot of Clairvaux.

Charged in Rome with profligate overspending by Hilduin de Vendeuvre, he was suspended by Pope Innocent III.

He then made a pilgrimage to the Holy Land. On his return, he resigned and retired to  Clairvaux Abbey until his death, which likely occurred in 1225 (though certain 19th-century historians say 1200).

Notes and references 

12th-century French people
Bishops of Langres
Year of birth unknown